The Beta Pictoris Moving Group is a young moving group of stars located relatively near Earth. A moving group, in astronomy, is a group of stars that share a common motion through space as well as a common origin. This moving group is named for Beta Pictoris.

The Beta Pictoris Moving Group is an important object for astronomical study as it is the closest youthful group of stars to the Earth. The star Beta Pictoris is known to have a large disk of gas and dust, possibly a protoplanetary disk. There is also evidence of a young gas giant planet around the star. A free-floating planet has also been found in the moving group, PSO J318.5-22. The age and distance of the group makes it a candidate for directly imaging extrasolar planets.

Constituents
The Beta Pictoris Moving Group consists of 17 stellar systems, comprising a total of 28 individual component stars, including identified brown dwarfs.  The core of the group is located some 115 light-years from Earth, and has an average estimated age of between 20 and 26 million years.

The majority of the group is made up of cool, dim K and M class stars.  Most are not visible to the naked eye. The members that are visible to the naked eye are:

Beta Pictoris
Eta Telescopii
51 Eridani
HD 203
HD 146624
HD 165189
HD 172555
Beta Trianguli Australis (potential member)

The group covers a region of space for the most part visible only in the Southern Hemisphere, as shown in the map below.

Discovery
An early estimated age for the star Beta Pictoris at about 10 million years proved problematic due to the star's apparent isolation in space.  According to current theory regarding stellar evolution, extremely young stars of this age should be located near other young stars that formed from the same region in space.  It is not until significantly later that gravitational interactions with other stars causes stellar 'siblings' to disperse.

In 1999 the situation was resolved by the discovery of a pair of dim red dwarf stars that were found to have a similar velocity and age to β Pictoris, lending credence to the estimated age of the star.

Further work published in 2001 identified a total of 17 stellar systems with a similar motion and age as the Beta Pictoris moving group, named for the primary member of the association.

Origin
The movements of the group were tracked to the positions they occupied 11.5Myr ago, where they occupied a space 3 times smaller than their current distribution (24pc, versus 72pc today) situated in between two regions of the Scorpius-Centaurus OB star group, and it was suggested that they originated there when a supernova from either OB region of Scorpius-Centaurus OB would have been close enough to trigger stellar formation.

See also 

 List of nearby stellar associations and moving groups
 AB Doradus moving group
 TW Hydrae association

References

 
Moving groups